phph or PhPh may refer to:

 phph, an abbreviation for the pH indicator phenolphthalein
 PhPh, chemical shorthand notation for two phenyl groups attached to each other; see biphenyl